Greg Treat (born May 9, 1978) is an American Republican politician from Oklahoma and the current President Pro Tempore of the Oklahoma Senate. He represents district 47, which includes parts of Oklahoma City, Edmond, Deer Creek, and Bethany. He has served in the Senate since 2011.

Treat is an Oklahoma City resident and an alumnus of the University of Oklahoma. Prior to taking office, he was a campaign director for several Republican campaigns in the state.

Career

Elections
Treat was first elected to his seat in a 2011 special election to replace Todd Lamb, who left his seat to become Oklahoma's lieutenant governor. He defeated four other candidates in the Republican primary and did not face a Democratic opponent. He was reelected in 2012 without opposition and defeated Democrat Judy Mullen Hopper in 2016 with 66.35% of the vote.

Legislation
In 2019, Treat authored a bill to create the Legislative Office of Fiscal Transparency, an entity to increase transparency and accountability in state government by providing the public and lawmakers independent, objective data on state spending and program performance. Treat also authored several landmark government accountability] measures that give the governor the ability to hire and fire the director of five of the largest state agencies. Treat authored Senate Bill 1848 in 2014, which required abortion providers to have admitting privileges at a hospital within  of their practice. The law was struck down by the Oklahoma Supreme Court in 2016, with the court citing Whole Woman's Health v. Hellerstedt as a precedent.

References

|-

1978 births
21st-century American politicians
Living people
Republican Party Oklahoma state senators
Politicians from Oklahoma City
University of Oklahoma alumni